The Priest of St. Pauli is a 1970 West German drama film directed by Rolf Olsen and starring Curd Jürgens. Two years earlier they had made the similarly-themed The Doctor of St. Pauli together.

Plot
A former submarine commander turned priest tends to the inhabitants of St. Pauli, the red light district of Hamburg.

Cast

References

External links

1970 drama films
German drama films
West German films
Films directed by Rolf Olsen
Films set in Hamburg
Constantin Film films
Terra Film films
1970s German-language films
1970s German films